Strategic communication can mean either communicating a concept, a process, or data that satisfies a long-term strategic goal of an organization by allowing facilitation of advanced planning, or communicating over long distances usually using international telecommunications or dedicated global network assets to coordinate actions and activities of operationally significant commercial, non-commercial and military business or combat and logistic subunits. It can also mean the related function within an organization, which handles internal and external communication processes.  Strategic communication can also be used for political warfare.

Definition of strategic communication
Strategic communication refers to policy-making and guidance for consistent information activity within an organization and between organizations. Equivalent business management terms are: integrated (marketing) communication, organizational communication, corporate communication, institutional communication, etc. (see paragraph on 'Commercial Application' below).

In the U.S. government context, strategic communication has been defined as "Focused United States Government efforts to understand and engage key audiences to create, strengthen, or preserve conditions favorable for the advancement of United States Government interests, policies, and objectives through the use of coordinated programs, plans, themes, messages, and products synchronized with the actions of all instruments of national power."

Strategic communication management could be defined as the systematic planning and realization of information flow, communication, media development and image care in a long-term horizon. It conveys deliberate messages through the most suitable media to the designated audiences at the appropriate time to contribute to and achieve the desired long-term effect. Communication management is process creation. It has to bring three factors into balance: the message, the media channel and the audience.

An alternative view of strategic communication is offered by Steve Tatham of the UK Defence Academy. He argues that whilst it is desirable to bound and coordinate communications together - particularly from governments or the military - it should be regarded in a much more fundamental manner than simply process. The 'informational effect' should be placed at the very epi-centre of command and that all action must be calibrated against that effect - including the evaluation of 2nd and 3rd order effects.  This is, he argues, proper Strategic Communication (communication singular — an abstract noun) whilst the actual process of communicating (which includes Target Audience Analysis, evaluation of conduits, measurements of effect etc.) — is Strategic Communications (plural).

In the August 2008 paper, "DoD Principles of Strategic Communication," Robert T. Hastings Jr., acting Assistant Secretary of Defense for Public Affairs, described strategic communication as "the synchronization of images, actions and words to achieve a desired effect."

Communication is strategic when it is completely consistent with the organisation's mission, vision, values and when it is able to enhance the strategic positioning and competitiveness between their competitors. It is important to understand the concept of communication strategy, it should be seen from the organization's perspective and no one else beside them. As a result of this communication, strategic communication should follow ‘The nature of organisational communication in general, and strategic communication in particular, is defined as the purposeful use of communication by an organisation to fulfill its mission’ stated by (Hallahan et al., 2007). Therefore, the Strategic Communications Framework should be lay out to aim the objectives of communicating to the audience/organisation. The deliberate application of the specific content will help achieve the business goal clearly. While communication is something that does happen in the organisation, businesses that take steps to implement sound strategies impacting the effectiveness of their business communications can achieve measurable results. According to Mulhern(2009), Technological advancement have been a huge factor in business meaning that information can be communicated through many diverse channels and media like the internet and through ads. Technology have been rapidly growing throughout the year pretty fast, accelerating communication that allow customers to connect and communicate with others. This will make it easier for them to reach to each other in a traditional communication way that suit the demand of their needs. ‘These changes mean that marketers are in a far more challenging competitive environment in attempting to fulfil customers wants and needs, while simultaneously seeking to develop long-term relationships’( Mulhern, 2009). Having changes in communication will help communication goals, organisation, and communication channels. This will have an effect of measuring the effectiveness of the communication tactics used in a business for their audience. To start a business no matter how small it is, communication strategy should be a goal to start with and it will indicate the future of the business. A business that communicate with their employees about benefit options will have increased the level of trust between them.

Application objectives
Strategic communication provides a conceptual umbrella that enables organizations to integrate their disparate messaging efforts. It allows them to create and distribute communications that, while different in style and purpose, have an inner coherence. This consistency can, in some instances, foster an echo chamber that reinforces the organizational message and brand. At the minimum, it prevents contradictory, confusing messaging to different groups across all media platforms.

Strategic planning 
To have an object, the first thing to do is have a plan for the business to communicate how the business is formed and to see how strong its core is. Ensure that alignment with the organization's understanding of where it is currently at.  An approach that could be used to determine the current state of the objective, is to do a SWOT (Strengths, Weaknesses, Opportunities, and Threats) analysis. When using a SWOT analysis, the strengths and weaknesses must be realistic.  This is to help make improvements or adjustments that were not so good. The analysis will help get a better understanding of the business and will help plan and make the objectives more solid because it shows the strengths, weaknesses, opportunities, and threats the business is facing.  This helps decide where the business is today, and where it will be in the future.
Planning is a continuous process of research and analysis, task analysis, execution, and assessment. Success in this process requires diligent and continual analysis, and assessment being fed back into planning and actions.

Talk to key stakeholders 
Have interviews with the customers to learn their priorities and what goals they want to achieve with the organization. Having a good understanding of the business issues, this will allow the organisation to offer effective solutions that will help the objective. Ask questions to see what the customer's aim is, with the main goal to focus on what needs to be achieved and done and not what he/ or she wants. ‘Sustainability calls for a value chain approach, whereby firms need to take wider responsibility and collaborate with a range of stakeholders to ensure that unsustainable practices are addressed’ (Scandelius, & Cohen, 2015).

Develop actionable objectives 
Objectives should have a specific end points to provide an indicator of success. Kotler et al., (2013) stated by understanding the consumer and the marketplace, he or she can design a marketing strategy. To have an understanding to what is happening around the organisation will ensure that planning the marketing strategy will be easy because the vision is there and making sure the objectives are SMART. Objectives are the intended goals of a business campaigns, to show what is achievable. The objectives are effective when using SMART goals: they need to be specific, measurable, achievable, realistic, and time-sensitive. Have assignments for individuals or groups so the responsibilities for each of these objectives are already set and no adjustments are needed because they have been assigned to a specific person or group.  The responsibility is in their hands. This is to indicate the specific individual or group have a direct preliminary objective they are assigned to. They will need to develop a range of possible strategies and tactics to achieve the objectives given to them.

Develop and prioritise potential strategies and tactics 
Brainstorm a list of potential strategies achievable for each of the objectives given out by the business and its customers, and have tactics that will support these strategies and objectives. Gather as a team to discuss the merits of each proposed strategy to the organisation.  The discussion must be about the strategies that will most likely be able to be used and those that are unlikely to be used. Some strategies will not be achievable, will be difficult, or no solution will be available for them so these will be crossed off the list. This shortens the list and helps to round up the best strategies left to be used. Collectively decide which strategies and tactics are going to be pursued to provide a clear objective for the business. The main focus is to achieve the objectives that were given out by the organisation.

Metrics, timelines and responsibilities 
Have the detail behind those strategies and tactics named out so that there is a clear objective and what is needed to be focus on. Explain how it will be successful, how it is measured, the time frame and who will be responsible. To ensure that everything is successfully planned out and the success of these strategies and tactics. To do this planning wisely is a key part, planning does not only help a business achieve the objective but also helps with communication within the group. Everyone will be assigned to a responsibility so that these strategies and tactics are met.

Defense application

The recently approved NATO Policy on Strategic Communication defines Strategic Communication as "the coordinated and appropriate use of NATO communications activities and capabilities – Public Diplomacy, Military Public Affairs, Information Operations, and Psychological Operations, as appropriate – in support of Alliance policies, operations and activities, and in order to advance NATO's aims" (SG(2009)0794). "It is important to underline that Strategic Communication is first and foremost a process that supports and underpins all efforts to achieve the Alliance's objectives; an enabler that guides and informs our decisions, and not an organization
in itself. It is for this reason that Strategic Communication considerations should be integrated into the earliest planning phases - communication activities being a consequence of that planning" (MCM-0164-2009).

Commercial application
Strategic Communication is communication aligned with the company's overall strategy, to enhance its strategic positioning.

Otherwise known as public relations, strategic communication is a conscious, planned, ongoing endeavour by organizations to improve corporation and reduce conflict; with an end goal to create a receptive environment in which the organization's products or services can be marketed.

Concept development and experimentation (CD&E)
Strategic communication is currently subject to multinational CD&E, led by the military, because communication is always an indispensable part of crisis management and compliance strategies. Across the spectrum of missions and broadly covering all levels of involvement in a civil-military, comprehensive approach context, the function of Strategic Communication and its military tool for implementation – Information Operations – have evolved and are still under development, in particular concerning their exact delineation of responsibilities and the integration of non-military and non-coalition actors.

Three major lines of development are acknowledged as state of the art, with practical impact on current crisis management operations and/or multinational interoperability: (1) U.S. national developments, which one can argue have resulted in the most mature concepts for both Strategic Communication and Information Operations so far; (2) NATO concept development, which in the case of Strategic Communication is very much driven by current mission requirements (such as ISAF in Afghanistan), but also has benefitted much from multinational CD&E in the case of Information Operations; and (3) multinational CD&E projects such as the U.S.-led Multinational Experiment (MNE) series and the Multinational Information Operations Experiment (MNIOE), led by Germany.

Intensive discussions involving civil and military practitioners of Strategic Communication and Information Operations - with a view on existing national and NATO approaches to Strategic Communication, and current best practice - have questioned whether a new approach and definition of Strategic Communication really is required. Consequently, a reorientation of CD&E efforts was suggested, focussing now on the theme of "Integrated Communication", which better reflects the shared baseline assessment with a broader scope, including but not limited to Strategic Communication:

 the ineffective top-down approach to communication (mission-specific, strategic-political guidance for information activities; information strategy; corporate vision; shared narrative) and
 the insufficient horizontal and vertical integration of communication (cohesion of a coalition; corporate identity; cultural awareness; communication by words and deeds - the "say-do-gap"; involvement of non-coalition actors - participatory communication).

This change also should prevent false expectations of potential customers of resulting concepts who currently are reluctant to engage in CD&E on the widely implemented subject of Strategic Communication.

See also 

 Audience analysis

 Brand management
 Impression management
 Marketing communications
 Media intelligence
 Media manipulation
 Reputation management
 Public diplomacy
 Public relations

Notes

References

Grigorescu, A., & Lupu, M-M. (2015). Integrated Communication as Strategic Communication. Review of international comparative management [revista de management comparat international]. 16(4), 479–490.
Hallahan, K., Holtzhausen, D., Van Ruler, B., Veri, D., & Sriramesh, K. (2007). Defining strategic communication. International Journal of Strategic Communication. 1(1), 3–35. doi: 10.1080/15531180701285244 
Kitchen, P. J., Inga Burgmann, I. (2015). Integrated marketing communication: making it work at a strategic level. Journal of Business Strategy. 36(4), 34 – 39. doi: 10.1108/JBS-05-2014-0052 
Knudsen, G. H., & Lemmergaard, g. (2014). Strategic serendipity: How one organization planned for and took advantage of unexpected communicative opportunities. Culture & Organization. 20(5), 392–409. doi: 10.1080/14759551.2014.948440
Kotler, P., Burton, S., Deans, K., Brown, L., Armstrong, G. (2013). Designing a customer-driven marketing strategy. Marketing 9th ed (pp 10). NSW, Australia: Pearson Australia.
Kotler, P., Burton, S., Deans, K., Brown, L., Armstrong, G. (2013). Marketing planning. Marketing 9th ed (pp 78). NSW, Australia: Pearson Australia.
Kotler, P., Burton, S., Deans, K., Brown, L., Armstrong, G. (2013). Marketing strategies for competitive advantage. Marketing 9th ed (pp 81). NSW, Australia: Pearson Australia.
Mulhern, F. (2009). Integrated marketing communications: from media channels to digital connectivity. Journal of Marketing Communications. 15(2/3), 85-102. doi: 10.1108/JBS-05-2014-0052
Scandelius, C., Cohen, G. (2015). Achieving collaboration with diverse stakeholders. The role of strategic ambiguity in CSR communication. doi: 10.1016/j.jbusres.2016.01.037

Sources
Tatham S A  Cdr, RN. 

Military terminology
Mass media technology
Nuclear command and control
Military railways
Military radio systems
Maritime communication
Planning
Communication
Promotion and marketing communications

ru:Стратегическая коммуникация